Beat 'em ups are video games which pit a fighter or group of fighters against many underpowered enemies and bosses. Gameplay usually spans many levels, with most levels ending in an enemy boss. If multiple players are involved, players generally fight cooperatively.

It is often useful to characterise gameplay as either 2D (largely characterised by the player walking only to the left or right) or 3D (characterised by full movement in the implied horizontal plane, sometimes also with a button for jump). Graphics can likewise be categorised as 2D (with sprites, sometimes with an isometric or parallax effect) or 3D (polygons), or hybrid (e.g. sprite characters in front of polygon backgrounds, or vice versa).

Beat 'em ups

Games with beat 'em up sections

The Adventures of Bayou Billy - Konami
Asterix & Obelix XXL - Étranges Libellules
Asterix & Obelix XXL 2: Mission: Las Vegum - Étranges Libellules
Bébé's Kids - Radical Entertainment
Bully - Rockstar Vancouver
Bully: Scholarship Edition - Rockstar New England
Crash of the Titans - Radical Entertainment
Crash: Mind over Mutant - Radical Entertainment
Darkman - Ocean
Guilty Gear Isuka - Sammy
Guilty Gear Judgment - Sammy
Legend of Success Joe - Wave
Lego  video games - TT Games
Mortal Kombat: Armageddon - Midway
Ninja Golf - Atari
S.P.Y. the Special Project Y - Konami
Shenmue - Sega
Street Fighter EX3
Super Smash Bros. series - HAL Laboratory / Sora / Namco Bandai / Nintendo
Super Smash Bros. - HAL Laboratory / Nintendo
Super Smash Bros. Melee - HAL Laboratory / Nintendo
Super Smash Bros. Brawl - Sora / Nintendo
Super Smash Bros. for Nintendo 3DS and Wii U - Sora / Namco Bandai / Nintendo
Super Smash Bros. Ultimate - Sora / Namco Bandai / Nintendo
Tekken 3 - Namco
Tekken 4 - Namco
Tekken 5 - Namco
Tekken 6 - Namco Bandai
King Kong (2005 video game) - Ubisoft

Hack 'n slash

2D 
 The Legend of Kage (1985) - Taito
 Captain Silver (1987) - Data East
 Rastan (1987) - Taito
 Shinobi series (1987 debut) - Sega
 Ninja Gaiden (Shadow Warriors) series (1988 debut) - Tecmo
 Golden Axe series (1989 debut) - Sega
 Strider series (1989) - Capcom
 Danan: The Jungle Fighter (1990) - Sega
 First Samurai (1991) - Vivid Image
 Saint Sword (1991) - Taito
 Dragon's Crown (2013) - Vanillaware

3D 

300: March to Glory - Collision Studios
Afro Samurai - Namco Bandai Games
Akuji the Heartless - Crystal Dynamics
Astral Chain - PlatinumGames
The Astyanax - Aicom
Asura's Wrath - CyberConnect2
Attack on Titan - Koei Tecmo
Attack on Titan 2 
Bayonetta series - PlatinumGames
Bayonetta
Bayonetta 2
Beowulf: The Game - Ubisoft
Blades of Time - Gaijin Entertainment
Bladestorm: The Hundred Years' War - Omega Force
Blood Will Tell - Sega Wow/Red Entertainment
BloodRayne series - Terminal Reality
BloodRayne
BloodRayne 2
BloodRayne: Betrayal - WayForward
Bujingai - Taito/Red Entertainment
Castlevania: Curse of Darkness - Konami
Castlevania: Lament of Innocence - Konami
Castlevania: Lords of Shadow - Konami
Castlevania: Lords of Shadow - Mirror of Fate
Castlevania: Lords of Shadow 2
Chaos Legion - Capcom Production Studio 6
Conan - Nihilistic Software
Dante's Inferno - Visceral Games
Darksiders series - Vigil Games
Darksiders
Darksiders II
Darksiders III
Deadpool - High Moon Studios
Devil Kings/Sengoku Basara series - Capcom
Devil Kings/Sengoku Basara
Sengoku Basara 2
Devil May Cry series - Capcom
Devil May Cry
Devil May Cry 2
Devil May Cry 3: Dante's Awakening
Devil May Cry 4
Devil May Cry 5
DmC: Devil May Cry - Ninja Theory
Dragon Valor - Namco
Drakengard series - Cavia
Drakengard
Drakengard 2
Drakengard 3 - Access Games
Nier
Nier: Automata - PlatinumGames
Dungeon Magic - Taito
Dynasty Warriors series - Koei/Omega Force
Dynasty Warriors 2
Dynasty Warriors 3
Dynasty Warriors 4
Dynasty Warriors 5
Dynasty Warriors 6
Dynasty Warriors 7
Dynasty Warriors 8
Dynasty Warriors 9
El Shaddai: Ascension of the Metatron - Ignition Tokyo
Gauntlet series - Atari Games
Gauntlet
Gauntlet II
Gauntlet (NES) - Tengen
Gauntlet: The Third Encounter
Gauntlet III: The Final Quest - Tengen
Gauntlet Legends
Gauntlet Dark Legacy - Midway Games West
Gauntlet: Seven Sorrows - Midway Games
Genji series - Game Republic
Genji: Dawn of the Samurai
Genji: Days of the Blade
Ghost Rider - Climax Group
Gladiator: Sword of Vengeance - Acclaim Studios Manchester
God of War series - Santa Monica Studio
God of War
God of War II
God of War III
God of War: Ascension
God of War (2018)
God of War Ragnarök
God of War: Chains of Olympus - Ready at Dawn
God of War: Ghost of Sparta - Ready at Dawn
God of War: Betrayal - Javaground/SOE Los Angeles
Golden Axe: Beast Rider - Secret Level
Heavenly Sword - Ninja Theory
Hulk - Radical Entertainment
Killer Is Dead - Grasshopper Manufacture
Legacy of Kain: Defiance - Crystal Dynamics/Nixxes Software BV
The Legend of Korra - PlatinumGames
Lollipop Chainsaw - Grasshopper Manufacture
The Lord of the Rings series
The Lord of the Rings: The Two Towers - Stormfront Studios/Hypnos Entertainment
The Lord of the Rings: The Return of the King - EA Redwood Shores
Lucifer Ring - Toshiba EMI 
Mazan: Flash of the Blade - Namco
 MediEvil series 
 MediEvil
 MediEvil 2
 MediEvil: Resurrection
 MediEvil (2019)
Metal Gear Rising: Revengeance - PlatinumGames
Middle-earth: Shadow of Mordor - Monolith Productions
Middle-earth: Shadow of War
Muramasa: The Demon Blade - Vanillaware
Nano Breaker - Konami
Ninja Blade - FromSoftware
Ninja Gaiden: Second Series - Team Ninja
Ninja Gaiden
Ninja Gaiden Black
Ninja Gaiden Sigma
Ninja Gaiden Dragon Sword
Ninja Gaiden II
Ninja Gaiden Sigma 2
Ninja Gaiden 3
Ninja Gaiden 3: Razor's Edge
Yaiba: Ninja Gaiden Z
Ninja Spirit - Irem
No More Heroes series - Grasshopper Manufacture
No More Heroes
No More Heroes 2: Desperate Struggle
Travis Strikes Again: No More Heroes
The OneChanbara series - Tamsoft
Onimusha series - Capcom
Onimusha: Warlords
Onimusha 2: Samurai's Destiny
Onimusha 3: Demon Siege
Onimusha: Dawn of Dreams
Otogi series - FromSoftware
Otogi: Myth of Demons
Otogi 2: Immortal Warriors
Prince of Persia: The Sands of Time series - Ubisoft
Prince of Persia: The Sands of Time
Prince of Persia: Warrior Within
Prince of Persia: Revelations (PSP)
Prince of Persia: The Two Thrones
Prince of Persia: Rival Swords (PSP)
Prince of Persia: The Forgotten Sands
Prince of Persia - Ubisoft
Ragnarok Battle Offline - French Bread
Red Steel 2 - Ubisoft
Rune - Human Head Studios
Rune: Halls of Valhalla
Rurouni Kenshin: Enjou! Kyoto Rinne - Banpresto
Rygar: The Legendary Adventure - Tecmo
Samurai Champloo: Sidetracked - Grasshopper Manufacture
Samurai Warrior: The Battles of Usagi Yojimbo - Beam Software / Firebird
Samurai Warriors series - Koei, Omega Force
Samurai Warriors
Samurai Warriors: Xtreme Legends
Samurai Warriors: State of War
Samurai Warriors 2
Samurai Warriors 2: Empires
Samurai Warriors 2: Xtreme Legends
Samurai Warriors 3
Savage - Probe Software
Seven Samurai 20XX - Dimps
Severance: Blade of Darkness - Rebel Act Studios
Shadow Force: Henshin Ninja - Technos
Shinobi series - Sega
Shinobi (Arcade)
The Revenge of Shinobi
Shadow Dancer
The Cyber Shinobi
Shinobi (Sega Game Gear)
Shinobi II: The Silent Fury
Shinobi III: Return of the Ninja Master
Shinobi Legions
Shinobi
Nightshade
Skull & Crossbones - Atari Games
The werehog gameplay of Sonic Unleashed - Sega
Soulcalibur Legends - Bandai Namco Entertainment
Spartan: Total Warrior - The Creative Assembly
Splatterhouse (2010) - Bandai Namco Entertainment
Star Wars: The Force Unleashed series - LucasArts
Star Wars: The Force Unleashed
Star Wars: The Force Unleashed II
Sudeki - Climax Group
Sword of the Berserk: Guts' Rage - Yuke's
Sword of Sodan - Innerprise
Targhan - Silmarils
Teenage Mutant Ninja Turtles: Mutants in Manhattan - PlatinumGames
The Nightmare Before Christmas: Oogie's Revenge - Capcom
Transformers: Devastation - PlatinumGames
Trinity: Souls of Zill O'll - Omega Force
Van Helsing - Saffire
Viking: Battle for Asgard - The Creative Assembly
Warrior Blade: Rastan Saga Episode III - Taito
Warriors Orochi series - Koei, Omega Force
Warriors Orochi
Warriors Orochi 2
Warriors Orochi Z
The Wonderful 101 - PlatinumGames
Wulverblade - Darkwind Media
X-Blades - Gaijin Entertainment
X-Men Origins: Wolverine - Raven Software
Xena: Warrior Princess - Vivendi
Yakuza Ishin
Yakuza Kenzan
Yakuza Kiwami
Yakuza Kiwami 2
Yumi: Samurai Warrior - LTBDesigns

See also 
 Beat 'em up
 Hack and slash
 List of fighting games

References 

Beat em ups